The video assistant referee (VAR) is a match official in association football who reviews decisions made by the referee.

The assistant video assistant referee (AVAR) is a current or former referee appointed to assist the VAR in the video operation room. The responsibilities of the AVAR include watching the live action on the field while the VAR is undertaking a "check" or a "review", to keep a record of reviewable incidents, and to communicate the outcome of a review to broadcasters.

Following extensive trialling in a number of major competitions, VAR was formally written into the Laws of the Game by the International Football Association Board (IFAB) on March 3, 2018. Operating under the philosophy of "minimal interference, maximum benefit", the VAR system seeks to provide a way for "clear and obvious errors" and "serious missed incidents" to be corrected.

Procedure
There are four categories of decisions that can be reviewed.
 Goal/no goal – attacking team commits an offence, ball out of play, ball entering goal, offside, handball, offences and encroachment during penalty kicks.
 Penalty/no penalty – attacking team commits an offence, ball out of play, location of offence, incorrect awarding, offence not penalised.
 Direct red card – denial of obvious goal-scoring opportunity, serious foul play, violent conduct/biting/spitting, using offensive/insulting/abusive language or gestures. All straight red cards are subject to review.
 Mistaken identity in awarding a red or yellow card.

Check

The VAR and the AVARs automatically check every on-field referee decision falling under the four reviewable categories. If the VAR does not identify any mistake during the check, he or she will communicate this to the referee. This is called a "silent check" and requires no further action, usually not causing any delay to the game. At other times, a VAR check may cause the game to be delayed while the VAR ascertains whether or not a possible mistake has occurred. The referee may delay the restart of play for this to occur, and indicates an ongoing check by pointing to his or her ear.

Where the VAR does identify a possible clear and obvious error, there are three possible scenarios:
 Decision overturned on advice of VAR
 On-field review (OFR) recommended
 Referee chooses to ignore VAR advice

A decision can generally be overturned without an OFR where it relates to a factual matter. For example, offside decisions or whether a foul occurred inside or outside the penalty area can be determined by the VAR to the referee without a review. An OFR is generally recommended where there is a subjective decision to make, such as whether a foul was committed in the first place or whether a red card is warranted for a certain offence. In all cases, the final decision rests with the referee, and they can choose to ignore the advice of the VAR altogether.

On-field review (OFR)
An OFR can only be conducted on the recommendation of the VAR. This ensures that the referee always makes an on-field ruling and does not rely on OFRs for every close decision. An OFR can be conducted when the ball is out of play, or where the referee stops play for the express purpose of conducting one.
The referee signals an OFR by making the outline of a rectangle, indicating a video screen. The OFR takes place in a designated referee review area (RRA), adjacent to the field of play and in public view to ensure transparency. Slow motion replays are only used to establish point of contact for physical offences and handball, while full-speed replays are shown to determine the intensity of an offence or whether a handball occurred in the first place. During an OFR, the VAR transmits several video replays from different camera angles to assist the referee in making a decision.

Once an OFR is completed, the referee makes the TV signal again, before indicating the decision made. If the ball was out of play, it restarts with either the original decision or the new decision if the on-field one was changed. If play was stopped to conduct an OFR and the decision was not changed, a dropped ball occurs.

Offences
A number of offences relating to the VAR process are codified within the Laws of the Game. Both players and team officials can be cautioned for excessively protesting an on-field decision by making the TV signal. Any player or team official entering the RRA are also cautioned. Finally, entering the VOR will cause a player or team official to be sent off.

Location 
The VAR and the AVARs are often located within the stadium where the match is being played. Certain leagues have begun using a centralized review location.  For example, the English Premier League stations all its VAR teams in the video operation room (VOR) at Stockley Park in London.  During its 2022 season, Major League Soccer in the United States created a Video Review Center in Atlanta where all its VAR teams operate.

Glossary
A number of technical terms and abbreviations are used in reference to the VAR system. These include:

 Check – Process by which the VAR automatically inspects all reviewable decisions. A check can result in confirmation of the on-field decision (a "silent check"), a change in decision for factual matters (e.g. offside/not offside) or the recommendation of an OFR.
 Clear and obvious error – Degree required for an on-field decision to be overturned.
 OFR – On-field review; review process that occurs following recommendation by the VAR. Used where a clear and obvious mistake may have been made in regards to a subjective decision.
 RO – Replay operator; non-referee official who assists video officials by managing the broadcast and finding the best angles to allow for the right decision to be made
 RRA – Referee review area; area where an OFR is conducted, located adjacent to the field of play and in sight at all times
 VAR – Video Assistant Referee; main video official whose main role is to check all reviewable incidents and recommend an OFR where a possible clear and obvious error has occurred. The VAR is a current or former qualified referee.
 AVAR – Assistant VAR; official that assists the VAR by watching the live action on the field while the VAR is undertaking a "check" or a "review".
 Offside VAR – AVAR official that anticipates and checks any potential offside situations in game-changing situations.
 Support VAR – AVAR official that coordinates communication between VAR officials and focuses on the television programme feed.
 Video official – Category of match official, alongside on-field officials. Consists of VAR and any AVARs.
 VOR – Video operation room; room where the VAR team is located. The VOR can be located in or near the stadium, or in a centralised location such as a broadcast centre.

History

VAR was conceived by the Refereeing 2.0 project in the early 2010s, under the direction of the Royal Netherlands Football Association (KNVB). The system was tested through mock trials during the 2012–13 season of the Eredivisie, the country's top football league. In 2014, the KNVB petitioned the International Football Association Board (IFAB) to amend its laws of the games to allow the system to be used during more extensive trials. The IFAB approved trials and a pathway to full implementation during its 2016 general meeting. Lukas Brud, IFAB secretary, said "With all the 4G and Wi-Fi in stadia today...we knew we had to protect referees from making mistakes that everyone can see immediately", such as Thierry Henry’s handball that eliminated Ireland from qualifying for the 2010 FIFA World Cup where the on-field referees were not in a position to view the infraction. Then-FIFA president Sepp Blatter, who was strongly against introducing new technology in football, was forced out of his post due to a corruption scandal in 2015, and the VAR proposal received a warm reception under his successor Gianni Infantino.

The first live trial of the VAR system was in July 2016 in a friendly match between PSV and FC Eindhoven.

The next live trial of the VAR system began in August 2016 with a United Soccer League match between two Major League Soccer reserve sides. Match referee Ismail Elfath reviewed two fouls during the match and, after consultation with video assistant referee Allen Chapman, decided to issue a red card and a yellow card in the respective incidents.

Video reviews were introduced the following month during an international friendly between France and Italy.

The first professional "non-friendly" game was an official first round KNVB Cup tie between Ajax and Willem II on 21 September 2016. This match was the first match to include a "pitchside monitor". The pitchside monitor would allow the referee to review footage from the field. Based on VAR but not using the available pitchside monitor, a yellow card was turned into a red card and thus this was the first ever VAR based expulsion in a professional game.
Interestingly, this professional and official Cup game was played before the official FIFA rule changes. Although viewers watching the match on television were made aware of the decision, the public in the stadium and, to a lesser extent, the players were confused as to what had happened. The major lesson from the confusion around this first major decision change was that VAR decisions needed to be clearly communicated to the players, the watching public inside the stadium, and on TV.

The next event that VAR was used, including a "pitchside monitor" was at the 2016 FIFA Club World Cup. Kashima Antlers were awarded a penalty after a video review in the 3–0 win of semi-final against Atlético Nacional.

The A-League in Australia became the first to use a VAR system in a top flight professional club competition on 7 April 2017, when Melbourne City played Adelaide United though this game was completed without the VAR being called upon. The first intervention by a VAR in a professional national league game was seen on 8 April when Wellington Phoenix hosted Sydney FC. The VAR identified an illegal handball in the penalty area and awarded Sydney FC a penalty. The game finished in a 1–1 draw.

Major League Soccer in the United States introduced VAR in competitive matches during its 2017 season after the 2017 MLS All-Star Game on 2 August 2017. Its first official use came during a match between the Philadelphia Union and FC Dallas, invalidating a goal from the latter over contact made between a Dallas player and Philadelphia's goalkeeper. VAR was used at an international level in the 2017 FIFA Confederations Cup in June, where it was praised, but its usefulness was questioned after a referee decision in the final match.

Also in 2017, Portuguese Football Federation (FPF) had its first official match using VAR, during Portuguese Cup Final between SL Benfica and Vitoria SC at Jamor Stadium on the 28 May 2017. Portuguese Football Federation was the first country in the world to use VAR in a Women's competition: one week after men's Cup final, in the same stadium, VAR was officially used in a Women's match between Sporting CP and SC Braga.

After the 2016 introduction in CUP football in Europe, the VAR system was introduced in top flight European football league competitions by Bundesliga and the Serie A at the beginning of the 2017–18 season and by La Liga at the beginning of the 2018–19 season. The system was also used at the 2017 FIFA U-20 World Cup in October. On 8 January 2018, VAR was trialled for the first time in England in the 2017–18 FA Cup game between Brighton & Hove Albion and Crystal Palace, and the following day it was trialled for the first time in France in the Côte d'Azur derby game in the 2017–18 French League Cup. It was said to have worked well.

Italy opened the world's first VAR training centre in Coverciano in January 2018.

On 3 March 2018, the IFAB wrote VAR into the Laws of the Game on a incorrect basis. Its use remains optional for competitions, and the English Premier League and the UEFA Champions League were not expected to implement VAR for their 2018–19 season. However Premier League executive chairman Richard Scudamore described it as "inevitable" that VAR will be introduced to the Premier League. On 27 September 2018, UEFA announced that from the 2019–20 UEFA Champions League season, VAR will be used in the competition. Although VAR was not implemented in the group stages of the 2018–19 season, UEFA announced on 3 December 2018, that VAR would be used in the knockout stages, which commenced in February 2019.

On 15 November 2018, Premier League teams voted in principle to bring Video Assistant Referees to the Premier League from the 2019–20 season onwards pending approval of IFAB and FIFA; this came after a controversial decision from referee Simon Hooper to disallow a goal scored by Southampton F.C. striker Charlie Austin.

On 1 January 2020, the Emperor's Cup Final was the first Japanese football match to use VAR. This was also a preparation for the introduction of VAR into Olympic football.

Notable uses of VAR

2018 FIFA World Cup 
FIFA officially approved the use of VAR for the 2018 FIFA World Cup during the FIFA Council meeting on 16 March 2018 in Bogotá. This tournament became the first competition to use VAR in full (at all matches and in all venues).

The 2018 World Cup marked the system's World Cup debut. A total of 335 incidents were checked by the VAR over the course of the group stage, averaging seven per match, and fourteen calls made by referees were changed or overruled after being reviewed by the VAR. According to FIFA, the VAR system had a success rate of 99.3 percent, up from the 95 percent of correct calls by referees without VAR. The first VAR decision at the World Cup came on 16 June 2018 in a group stage match between France and Australia, where referee Andres Cunha awarded a penalty to France after consulting with the VAR. In the final, referee Néstor Pitana used the VAR to review a defensive foul for handling in the penalty area, awarding France a penalty, which gave them a 2–1 lead over Croatia. The final eventually ended with France prevailing 4–2.

The use of VAR has been credited with assisting the 2018 edition's status as the cleanest World Cup since 1986, after no red cards were issued in the opening 11 games and only four players were sent off in the entire tournament which was the fewest since 1978. 22 goals were scored from 29 awarded penalty kicks, beating the previous record of 17 penalty kick goals set in the 1998 tournament; the dramatic increase in the number of penalties awarded at the 2018 World Cup has been attributed to VAR catching fouls which would otherwise have remained unpunished. IFAB technical director and former Premier League referee David Elleray stated a belief that the presence of VAR meant that players would know that they would not be able to get away with anything under the new system.

Criticism
The use of video technology at the 2017 FIFA Confederations Cup was criticised after several contentious moments involving VAR at the tournament. It was accused of "creating as much confusion as clarity".

Further criticism was leveled at VAR after it suffered issues preventing its use, for example in a Portuguese match where a supporter's flag had been obscuring the VAR camera, or in the 2018 A-League Grand Final between Newcastle Jets and Melbourne Victory where the VAR software suffered a technical malfunction which prevented the assistant referee from viewing the replay.

After the introduction of VAR in the 2018 World Cup, FIFA deemed it a success. Nevertheless, the use (or lack of use) of VAR has been criticised. Independent assessments note that while most decisions were made correctly as a result of VAR, some were wrong despite VAR review and some decisions which were called incorrectly were not even reviewed. The Guardian concludes that VAR has been most effective for factual decisions such as offsides and mistaken identities, while subjective decisions such as penalties or the disciplining of players have fared much worse. Lack of clarity and consistency are two main areas of weakness.

Another line of criticism has been targeted at the effectiveness of the system in achieving its goal. In the opinion of Scott Stinson from the National Post, VAR, like any other replay system, fails to correct human error and instead only adds to the controversies because human judgment is still necessary. Lack of transparency is another contentious point, as teams have no way to know which incidents were reviewed by the VAR team. At a press conference held after the group stage, FIFA referees committee chairman Pierluigi Collina showed footage of the decision-making process accompanied with audio of the conversations between VAR officials and the referees. Asked if this audio could be made publicly available, as it is in rugby and cricket, Collina answered affirmatively but cautioned that it might still be too early.

Others have pointed to the game-changing nature of VAR. There is an increase in the number and duration of pause in the game with VAR system. Initial fears that using the system would lengthen the game considerably have not been confirmed, with every VAR review taking up an average of only 80 seconds. The dramatic increase in the number of penalties awarded at the 2018 World Cup has been attributed to VAR catching fouls which would otherwise have remained unpunished. Of the 169 goals scored in the tournament, 22 were from penalty kicks (with 29 being awarded in total), beating the previous record of 17 set in the 1998 FIFA World Cup. Jonathan Liew of The Independent compares the situation to the introduction of the Decision Review System in cricket and notes the changes it had on that sport, and suggests that it might lead to changes of a similar nature in football.

In February 2019, UEFA issued guidance which stated that players who made a "TV-screen" hand gesture should result in a yellow card. "Excessively using the 'review' (TV screen) signal" is now listed as a caution for which a player may receive a yellow card in the Laws of the Game. Early uses of VAR in the Premier League, at the beginning of the 2019–20 season, were described as confusing to both coaches and fans with the decision making often inconsistent. By 2022 the application of VAR in the Premier League was still subject to criticism. On 3 September 2022, games involving Chelsea, West Ham United, Newcastle United, Crystal Palace, Brentford and Leeds United all contained contentious VAR decisions.

Competitions using VAR
Competitions which include VAR confirmed matches are "live" matches, i.e. where the VARs have contact with the referee on the field of play and therefore may have an impact on the decision making.

There is also an idea of implementing VAR in futsal matches.

Club competitions

International
 FIFA
 FIFA Club World Cup
UEFA–CONMEBOL Under-20 Intercontinental Cup

Continental

Regional
 UAFA
 Arab Club Champions Cup

Domestic leagues

Domestic cups

National team competitions

International

Continental

Regional
 AGCFF
 Arabian Gulf Cup

See also
 Goal-line technology
 Instant replay – describes other sports using video referees.

Notes

References

External links

 Experiments with Video Assistant Referees (VARs) from FIFA
 Video Assistant Referees (VARs) Experiment Protocol (Summary) from IFAB
 VAR – The System Explained from FIFA
 What is VAR

Laws of association football
Association football referees
Sports officiating technology
Video